MicroPort is a global medical device developer and manufacturer that is headquartered in Shanghai, China. It designs and produces products for a range of medical fields including cardiology, interventional radiology, orthopedics, electrophysiology, and surgical management. MicroPort is considered to be among the top 100 medical device companies in 2018 and was selected to be the 2017 China Innovative Medical Device Company.

History 
MicroPort was founded in 1998 by Zhaohua Chang, who currently serves as CEO, chairman, and Director. The company rose to prominence from the early success of its coronary stent line due its focus on serving the needs of the Chinese device market. It is now one of the top global manufacturers of cardiac interventional devices. Notably, it produces the world's first and only commercially available targeted drug eluting stent system, which uses a significantly reduced amount of drug than traditional drug eluting stents while maintaining effectiveness. As of early 2018, MicroPort is one of few medical device companies still developing a commercial coronary bioresorbable stent with ongoing clinical trials.

Beginning in the 2010s, MicroPort has rapidly expanded around the world via international acquisitions to other medical device industries, including orthopedics and cardiac rhythm management, and is valued at over US$1 Billion.

In 2019, MicroPort announced a US$398 Million investment to develop pacemakers and defibrillators in France.

Acquisitions 
In 2014 MicroPort expanded operations in the United States by acquiring Wright Medical's OrthoRecon business to become the 6th largest international producer of orthopedic devices. MicroPort's orthopedic business is based in Arlington, Tennessee and in 2018 has expanded its business into India.

In 2018 MicroPort and LivaNova closed the sale of LivaNova's cardiac rhythm management business for $190M.

In 2018 MicroPort purchased Lombard Medical, a US-based endovascular device company, from bankruptcy after it defaulted on loans in early 2018.

References 

Medical device manufacturers
Life sciences industry
Medical technology companies of China
Companies listed on the Hong Kong Stock Exchange
Health care companies established in 1998
Technology companies established in 1998
Chinese companies established in 1998
Manufacturing companies based in Shanghai
Chinese brands